The 1971 World Fencing Championships were held in Vienna, Austria. The event took place from July 4 to July 17, 1971.

Medal table

Medal summary

Men's events

Women's events

References

FIE Results

World Fencing Championships
F
1971 in Austrian sport
1970s in Vienna
Sports competitions in Vienna
1971 in fencing
July 1971 sports events in Europe